Urosaurus lahtelai is a species of lizard. The common name for this species is the Baja California brush lizard. Its range is in Mexico.

References 

Urosaurus
Reptiles of Mexico
Reptiles described in 1977